In enzymology, a [Skp1-protein]-hydroxyproline N-acetylglucosaminyltransferase is an enzyme that catalyzes the chemical reaction

UDP-N-acetylglucosamine + [Skp-protein]-hydroxyproline  UDP + [Skp-protein]-O-(N-acetyl-D-glucosaminyl)hydroxyproline

Thus, the two substrates of this enzyme are UDP-N-acetylglucosamine and Skp1-protein-hydroxyproline, whereas its two products are UDP and Skp1-protein-O-(N-acetyl-D-glucosaminyl)hydroxyproline.

This enzyme belongs to the family of glycosyltransferases, specifically the hexosyltransferases.  The systematic name of this enzyme class is UDP-N-acetyl-D-glucosamine:[Skp1-protein]-hydroxyproline N-acetyl-D-glucosaminyl-transferase. Other names in common use include Skp1-HyPro GlcNAc-transferase, UDP-N-acetylglucosamine (GlcNAc):hydroxyproline polypeptide, GlcNAc-transferase, UDP-GlcNAc:Skp1-hydroxyproline GlcNAc-transferase, and UDP-GlcNAc:hydroxyproline polypeptide GlcNAc-transferase.

References

 
 
 

EC 2.4.1
Enzymes of unknown structure